Ease of Access Center, formerly Utility Manager, is a component of the Windows NT family of operating systems that enables use of assistive technologies. Utility Manager is included with Windows 2000 and Windows XP. In Windows Vista, Utility Manager was replaced with the Ease of Access Center control panel applet, which is still included in Windows 10, Microsoft's latest operating system. The command-line shortcut (used in Windows Command Prompt or Run command) is utilman.

Features 
Here are a few of the current features of Ease of Access center:

Narrator 

Narrator is a screen reading application. It reads aloud text on the screen, notifications (such as calendar events), etc.

Magnifier 

Magnifier is a screen magnifier for visually impaired people that creates a bar at the top of the screen which magnifies the text which the mouse is hovering over.

Sticky keys 

Sticky keys is a feature for physically disabled people which allows them to type in capital letters without holding down , to prevent repetitive strain injury. The shortcut for sticky keys is to repeatedly press a key 5 times.

On-screen Keyboard 

The On-screen Keyboard is a virtual keyboard for people who do not have a physical keyboard.
Windows components
Accessibility